Jack Whitten (December 5, 1939 – January 20, 2018) was an American painter and sculptor. In 2016, he was awarded a National Medal of Arts.

Life 
Whitten was born in 1939 in Bessemer, Alabama. Planning a career as an army doctor, Whitten entered pre-medical studies at Tuskegee Institute from 1957 to 1959. He also traveled to nearby Montgomery, Alabama to hear Martin Luther King Jr. speak during the Montgomery bus boycott and was deeply moved by his vision for a changed America.

In 1960, Whitten went to Southern University in Baton Rouge, Louisiana to begin studying art and became involved in Civil Rights demonstrations there. Whitten participated in a march from downtown Baton Rouge to the state capitol. Whitten's artist ability led him to be in charge of producing the signs and slogans to be used at that demonstration.

Whitten believed strongly about Martin Luther King Jr.'s nonviolent approach. However, witnessing the violent reactions from the segregationist made him realize that if he remained in the South he would turn violent himself. Angered by the violent resistance to change he experienced he moved to New York City in 1960. He enrolled immediately at the Cooper Union in the fall of 1960, graduating with a bachelor's degree in fine art in 1964. Afterwards he remained in New York as a working artist, heavily influenced by the abstract expressionists then dominating the art community, especially Willem de Kooning and Romare Bearden.

Art
Shortly after graduating from Cooper Union, Whitten had the opportunity to meet other black artists which included, Jacob Lawrence and Norman Lewis, while he remained in New York to start his art career.

Whitten's art style was known to be abstract but he liked to refer to his art as art with truth and soul. A large number of Whitten's artwork was inspired by his own experiences during the Civil Rights Movement. Whitten concluded that slavery obstructed the culture of people of color. Therefore, Whitten believed that it was his destiny to restore the culture through his pieces.

Whitten's paintings dated back to as early as the 1960s. A large portion of Whitten's artwork had a feathery, soft effect which Whitten discovered was desirable by placing a nylon mesh fabric over his wet acrylic paintings. Whitten also used a T-shaped tool, which he would call the "developer". Whitten would move the T-shaped tool across the surface of his art in one single motion. This technique was used to represent one point being related to another.

One of Whitten's most famous pieces of work are his Black Monolith Series. Most of the work in this series was a homage or tribute to black activist, politicians and artists. The two known works from this series includes Whitten's, Black Monolith III for Barbara Jordan, 1998 and the author of Invisible Man, Black Monolith II for Ralph Ellison, 1994.

Whitten's work was featured in the Annual Exhibition of Contemporary American Painting at the Whitney Museum of American Art in 1972. The Whitney mounted a solo exhibition of his paintings in 1974. He has also had individual shows at numerous private galleries and universities, including a 10-year retrospective in 1983 at the Studio Museum in Harlem and an exhibition of memorial paintings in 2008 at the Atlanta Contemporary Arts Center in Atlanta, Georgia.

Whitten spent long portions of the summer in Crete, where he had a studio and made sculptures.

Throughout his career, Whitten concerned himself with the techniques and materials of painting and the relationship of artworks to their inspirations. At times he has pursued quickly-applied gestural techniques akin to photography or printmaking. At other times the deliberative and constructive hand is evident. The New York Times labeled him the father of a "new abstraction."

When the terrorist attacks on the World Trade Center occurred, Whitten was at his studio on Lispenard Street in Tribeca. In the following years, he constructed a monumental painting, with ashes embedded into it, as a memorial of the day.

President Barack Obama awarded Whitten the 2015 National Medal Of Arts Award.

Exhibitions
In 2013, curator Katy Siegel organized the exhibition Light Years: Jack Whitten, 1971-73  at the Rose Art Museum at Brandeis University. The exhibition featured many works created by Whitten between 1971-1973, which had never been exhibited before. In 2014, a retrospective exhibition was organized by The Museum of Contemporary Art in San Diego. The exhibition traveled to the Wexner Center for the Arts in 2015 and to the Walker Art Center in Minneapolis from September 13, 2015 to January 24, 2016  As part of his Walker engagement, Whitten wrote an Artist Op-Ed on racism and "the role of art in times of unspeakable violence."

On February 3, 2018 Crystal Bridges featured two of Whitten's pieces from the 1970s; one of which was the Homage to Malcolm, 1970.
 
In 2018, a retrospective "Odyssey: Jack Whitten Sculpture 1963–2016" was organized around the time of his passing and opened at the Baltimore Museum of Art from April 22, 2018 to July 29, 2018. The exhibition traveled to the Metropolitan Museum of Art in New York from September 6 to December 2, 2018 and the Museum of Fine Arts, Houston from March 3 to May 27, 2019. In 2019, the first solo exhibition in a European institution was shown at Hamburger Bahnhof Museum für Gegenwart Berlin.

Art market
Whitten was represented by Hauser & Wirth (2016–2018), Alexander Gray Associates (2007–2016) and Zeno X Gallery.

Personal life
At 78, Whitten died on January 20, 2018. Whitten and his wife Mary resided in Queens, New York.

References

Further reading 
 Goldsmith, Kenneth (Summer 1994), "Jack Whitten", Bomb Magazine.
 Storr, Rober (September 2007), "Jack Whitten with Robert Storr", Brooklyn Rail
 Ostrove, Saul (April 2008), "Process, Image and Elegy", Art in America.
 Fox, Catherine (April 26, 2008), "Close to history: Alabama-born artist who boarded a bus to New York in 1960 makes a triumphant return to the South", Atlanta Journal-Constitution
 Moyer, Carrie (October 2009), "Jack Whitten", The Brooklyn Rail
 Jack Whitten at the MoMa PS1 (May 24—October 15, 2007)
 Kuo, Michelle (February 2012), "Artist's Portfolio: Jack Whitten," Artforum International

External links
 Chinese Sincerity, Jack Whitten, 1974, acrylic on canvas
 NY Times, obituary
 NY Times Art in Review, Roberta Smith, 1994

1939 births
2018 deaths
Abstract expressionist artists
20th-century American painters
American male painters
21st-century American painters
21st-century male artists
African-American contemporary artists
American contemporary artists
American contemporary painters
African-American painters
Painters from New York City
Artists from Birmingham, Alabama
Tuskegee University alumni
Cooper Union alumni
People from Bessemer, Alabama
People from Queens, New York
United States National Medal of Arts recipients